Soraya García (born 21 March 1978) is a Spanish handball player.

She was born in León, Spain. She competed at the 2004 Summer Olympics, where Spain finished 6th.

References

External links

1978 births
Living people
Sportspeople from León, Spain
Spanish female handball players
Olympic handball players of Spain
Handball players at the 2004 Summer Olympics
Mediterranean Games medalists in handball
Mediterranean Games gold medalists for Spain
Competitors at the 2005 Mediterranean Games
21st-century Spanish women